Anna Martinowa Zarina (17 September 1907 – 17 January 1984) was a Latvian artist who lived and worked in Belgium and primarily worked with oil paint.

Biography 
Zarina was born in Riga, Latvia, in 1907, and died in Antwerp, Belgium, in 1984. She attended the Latvian Academy of Art in 1928 and in 1935 received her diploma, afterwards moving to Antwerp. Zarina was a professor at the Royal Academy of Fine Arts (Antwerp) until 1972, with a particular focus on figurative painting.

References 

1907 births
1984 deaths
Artists from Riga
People from the Governorate of Livonia
Belgian women painters
Latvian women painters
20th-century Latvian women artists
20th-century Belgian women artists
20th-century Latvian painters
20th-century Belgian painters
Latvian emigrants to Belgium
Academic staff of the Royal Academy of Fine Arts (Antwerp)